Maryse Condé (née Boucolon; February 11, 1937) is a French novelist, critic, and playwright from the French Overseas department and region of Guadeloupe. Condé is best known for her novel Ségou (1984–85).

Her novels explore the African diaspora that resulted from slavery and colonialism in the Caribbean. Her novels, written in French, have been translated into English, German, Dutch, Italian, Spanish, Portuguese, and Japanese. She has won various awards, such as the Grand Prix Littéraire de la Femme (1986), Prix de l’Académie française (1988), Prix Carbet de la Carraibe (1997) and the New Academy Prize in Literature (2018) for her works.

Early life 
Born as Maryse Boucolon at Pointe-à-Pitre, Guadeloupe, she was the youngest of eight children. In an interview entitled "I Have Made Peace With My Island", Maryse Condé recounts aspects of her early life. Condé describes her parents as among the first black instructors in Guadeloupe. Condé's mother, Jeanne Quidal, directed her own school for girls. Condé's father, Auguste Boucolon-- previously an educator-- founded the small bank "Le Caisse Coopérative des prêts", which was later renamed "La Banque Antillaise."

Condé's father, Auguste Boucolon, had two sons from his first marriage: Serge and Albert. Condé's three sisters are named Ena, Jeanne and Gillette. Her four brothers are named Auguste, Jean, René, and Guy. Condé was born 11 years after Guy, making her the youngest of the eight children. Condé was born while her mother was 43, and her father 63. Condé describes herself as "the spoiled child", which she attributes to her parents older age, as well as the age-gap between her and her siblings.

Condé began writing at an early age. Before she was 12 years old, she had written a one-act, one-person play. The play was written as a gift for her mother's birthday.

After having graduated from high school, she attended Lycée Fénelon from 1953 to 1955. Condé was expelled after two years of attendance. Condé furthered her studies at the Université de Paris III (Sorbonne Nouvelle) in Paris. During her attendance, she, along with other West Indians, established the Luis-Carlos Prestes club.

Life
In 1958, Condé attended a rehearsal of Les Nègres/The Blacks by Jean Genet, where she would meet the Guinean actor Mamadou Condé. In August 1958, she married Mamadou Condé. They eventually had four children together (before separating in 1969). By November 1959, the couple's relationship had already become strained, and Condé moved to the Ivory Coast, where she would teach for a year.

During Condé's returns for the holidays, she became politically conscious through a group of Marxist friends. Condé's Marxist friends would influence her to move to Ghana.

Between the years 1960 and 1972, she taught in Guinea, Ghana (from where she was deported in the 1960s because of politics), and Senegal.

In 1973, she returned to Paris and taught Francophone literature at Paris VII (Jussieu), X (Nanterre), and Ill (Sorbonne Nouvelle). In 1975, she completed her M.A. and Ph.D. at the Sorbonne Nouvelle in Paris in comparative literature, examining black stereotypes in Caribbean literature.

In 1981, she and Condé divorced, having long been separated. The following year, she married Richard Philcox, the English-language translator of most of her novels.

She did not publish her first novel, Hérémakhonon, until she was nearly 40, as "[she] didn't have confidence in [herself] and did not dare present [her] writing to the outside world." However, Condé would not reach her current prominence as a contemporary Caribbean writer until the publication of her third novel, Ségou (1984).

Following the success of Ségou, in 1985, Condé was awarded a Fulbright scholarship to teach in the US. She became a professor of French and Francophone literature at Columbia University in New York City in 1995.

Condé has taught at various universities, including the University of California, Berkeley; UCLA, the Sorbonne, the University of Virginia, and the University of Nanterre. She retired from teaching in 2005.

Literary significance

Condé's novels explore racial, gender and cultural issues in a variety of historical eras and locales, including the Salem witch trials in I, Tituba: Black Witch of Salem (1986); the 19th-century Bambara Empire of Mali in Ségou (1984–1985); and the 20th-century building of the Panama Canal and its influence on increasing the West Indian middle class in Tree of Life (1987). Her novels trace the relationships between African peoples and the diaspora, especially the Caribbean.

Her first novel, Hérémakhonon, was published in 1976.  It was so controversial that it was pulled from the shelves after six months because of its criticism over the success of African socialism. While the story closely parallels Condé's own life during her first stay in Guinea, and is written as a first-person narrative, she stresses that it is not an autobiography. The book is the story, as she described it, of an "'anti-moi', an ambiguous persona whose search for identity and origins is characterized by a rebellious form of sexual libertinage".

She has kept considerable distance from most Caribbean literary movements, such as Negritude and Creolité, and has often focused on topics with strong feminist and political concerns. A radical activist in her work as well as in her personal life, Condé has admitted: "I could not write anything... unless it has a certain political significance. I have nothing else to offer that remains important."

Condé's later writings have become increasingly autobiographical, such as Tales From the Heart: True Stories From My Childhood (1999) and Victoire (2006), a fictional biography of her maternal grandmother in which she explores themes of motherhood, femininity, race relations, and the family dynamic in the postcolonial Caribbean. Who Slashed Celanire's Throat (2000) shows traces of Condé's paternal great-grandmother.

However, her 1995 novel Windward Heights is a reworking of Emily Brontë’s Wuthering Heights, which she had first read at the age of 14. Condé had long wanted to create a work around it, as an act of "homage." Her novel is set in Guadeloupe, and race and culture are featured as issues that divide people. Reflecting on how she drew from her Caribbean background in writing this book, she said: 
"To be part of so many worlds—part of the African world because of the African slaves, part of the European world because of the European education—is a kind of double entendre. You can use that in your own way and give sentences another meaning. I was so pleased when I was doing that work, because it was a game, a kind of perverse but joyful game."

Maryse Condé's literary archive (Maryse Condé Papers) are held at Columbia University Libraries.

Her 2023 novel The Gospel According to the New World was longlisted for the International Booker Prize and at the age of 86, she was the oldest writer ever to be longlisted for the prize.   The creation of the novel was by means of dictation to her husband and translator Richard Philcox, as she has a degenerative neurological disorder that makes it difficult to speak and see. Together, they are the first wife-and-husband author-translator team to be longlisted for the award.

Selected bibliography
Novels
Hérémakhonon (1976). Heremakhonon, trans. Richard Philcox (1982).
Une saison à Rihata (1981). A Season in Rihata, trans. Richard Philcox (1988).
Ségou : les murailles de terre (1984). Segu, trans. Barbara Bray (1987).
Ségou : la terre en miettes (1985). The Children of Segu, trans. Linda Coverdale (1989).
Moi, Tituba, sorcière… Noire de Salem (1986). I, Tituba: Black Witch of Salem, trans. Richard Philcox (1992).
La Vie scélérate (1987). Tree of Life, trans. Victoria Reiter (1992).
Traversée de la mangrove (1989). Crossing the Mangrove, trans. Richard Philcox (1995).
Les Derniers rois mages (1992). The Last of the African Kings, trans. Richard Philcox (1997).
La Colonie du nouveau monde (1993).
La Migration des coeurs (1995). Windward Heights, trans. Richard Philcox (1998).
Desirada (1997). Desirada, trans. Richard Philcox (2000).
Célanire cou-coupé (2000). Who Slashed Celanire's Throat?, trans. Richard Philcox (2004).
La Belle créole (2001). The Belle Créole, trans. Nicole Simek (2020).
Historie de la femme cannibale (2003). The Story of the Cannibal Woman, trans. Richard Philcox (2007).
Les Belles ténébreuses (2008).
En attendant la montée des eaux (2010). Waiting for the Waters to Rise, trans. Richard Philcox (2021).
Le Fabuleux et triste destin d’Ivan et d’Ivana (2017). The Wondrous and Tragic Life of Ivan and Ivana, trans. Richard Philcox (2020).
The Gospel According to the New World, trans. Richard Philcox (2023).

Plays

 An tan revolisyon, published in 1991, first performed in Guadeloupe in 1989
 Comedie d'Amour, first performed in Guadeloupe in 1993
 Dieu nous l'a donné, published in 1972, first performed in Paris in 1973
 La Mort d'Oluwemi d'Ajumako, published in 1973, first performed in 1974 in Gabon
 Le Morne de Massabielle, first version staged in 1974 in Puteaux (France), later staged in English in New York as The Hills of Massabielle (1991)
 Pension les Alizes, published in 1988, first staged in Guadeloupe and subsequently staged in New York as Tropical Breeze Hotel (1995)
 Les Sept voyages de Ti Noel (written in collaboration with José Jernidier), first performed in Guadeloupe in 1987
 Comme deux frères (2007). Like Two Brothers.

Other

 Entretiens avec Maryse Condé (1993). Conversations with Maryse Condé (1996). Interviews with Françoise Pfaff. English translation includes a new chapter based on a 1994 interview.
 Le coeur à rire et à pleurer : souvenirs de mon enfance (1999). Tales From the Heart: True Stories From My Childhood, trans. Richard Philcox (2001).
 Victoire, les saveurs et les mots (2006). Victoire: My Mother's Mother, trans. Richard Philcox (2006).
 La Vie sans fards (2012).  What Is Africa to Me? Fragments of a True-to-Life Autobiography, trans. Richard Philcox (2017).
 The Journey of a Caribbean Writer (2013). Collection of essays, translated by Richard Philcox.
Mets et merveilles (2015). Of Morsels and Marvels, trans. Richard Philcox (2015).

Awards and honours 
 1986: Le Grand Prix Littéraire de la Femme
 1988: Le Prix de l’Académie française (La vie scélérate)
 1988: Liberatur Prize (Ségou)
 1993: Puterbaugh Prize
 1997: Prix Carbet de la Caraibe (Desirada)
 1999: Marguerite Yourcenar Prize (Le coeur à rire et à pleurer)
 1999: Lifetime Achievement Award from New York University's Africana Studies program
 2001: Commandeur de l'Ordre des Arts et des Lettres by the French Government
 2005: Hurston & Wright Legacy Award (Who Slashed Celanire's Throat?)
 2007: Tropiques Prize of the Agence française de développement (Victoire, les saveurs et les mots)
 2010: Grand prix du roman métis (En attendant la montée des eaux)
 2018: New Academy Prize in Literature
 2021: Prix mondial Cino Del Duca

See also 

 Caribbean literature
 Postcolonial literature
 Negritude

References

External links
Finding aid to Maryse Condé papers at Columbia University. Rare Book & Manuscript Library.
French Guadeloupe writer Maryse Condé reading from her work in the Recording Laboratory, September 24, 1999 (Library of Congress)

 
Mekkawi, Mohamed. Maryse Condé: Novelist, Playwright, Critic, Teacher: An Introductory Biobibliography. Washington, D.C.: Howard University Libraries, 1990.
Perisic, Alexandra. Precarious Crossings: Immigration, Neoliberalism, and the Atlantic (on Maryse Condé, Roberto Bolaño, Giannina Braschi, Caryl Phillips), 2019.
 
Artist Page from the University of Minnesota 
 Présentation du Fonds Maryse Condé de la Médiathèque Caraïbe (laméca), ouvrages issus de la bibliothèque privée de Maryse Condé
 webGuinée - Maryse Condé
Maryse Condé recorded for the Archive of Literature from the Hispanic Division at the Library of Congress, Washington, D.D., on September 24, 1999.
Vanessa Lee, Four Caribbean Women Playwrights: Ina Césaire, Maryse Condé, Gerty Dambury and Suzanne Dracius (Palgrave Macmillan, 2021)

1937 births
Living people
Academic staff of the University of Paris
Columbia University faculty
French historical novelists
French women writers
Fulbright alumni
Guadeloupean novelists
Guadeloupean women writers
Sorbonne Nouvelle University Paris 3 alumni
University of California, Berkeley faculty
University of California, Los Angeles faculty
University of Virginia faculty
Writers of historical fiction set in the early modern period